Labaz may refer to:
 Lake Labaz
 Labaz Group, a pharmaceutical company bought by the Sanofi subsidiary of Elf Aquitaine in 1973